Don Kidd (October 10, 1937 – August 27, 2020) was an American politician who was a Republican member of the New Mexico State Senate from 1993 to 2005. Kidd died on August 27, 2020 at his home in Carlsbad, New Mexico. He was 82 years old and his cause of death was not released. Kidd attended Southern Methodist University and was a banker, eventually rising to the position of President and CEO of Western Commerce Bank.

References

1937 births
2020 deaths
People from Carlsbad, New Mexico
People from Foard County, Texas
Southern Methodist University alumni
Businesspeople from New Mexico
Republican Party New Mexico state senators